Glushko is a surname of Ukrainian descent, that may refer to :

People
 Julia Glushko (born 1990), an Israeli tennis player
 Lina Glushko (born 2000), an Israeli tennis player
 Robert J. Glushko (born 1953), a professor at the University of California, Berkeley
 Valentin Glushko (Valentyn Hlushko, 1908-1989), a Ukrainian Soviet engineer

Crater
 Glushko (crater), a young impact crater on the Moon

See also
 6357 Glushko, a Main-belt Asteroid
 Hlushko 
 Halushko